This is a list of the largest plants by clade. Measurements are based on height, volume, length, diameter, and weight, depending on the most appropriate way(s) of measurement for the clade.

Gymnosperms (Gymnospermae)

Conifers (Pinopsida)
The conifer division of plants include the tallest organism, and the largest single-stemmed plants by wood volume, wood mass, and main stem circumference.

Although typically not so large in volume, the closely related coast redwood (Sequoia sempervirens) of the Pacific coast in North America is taller, reaching a maximum height of  – the Hyperion Tree, which ranks it as the world's tallest known living tree and organism (not including its roots under ground). It fell during a storm in 1905.

The conifers also include the largest tree by circumference in the world, the Montezuma cypress (Taxodium mucronatum). These trees dwarf any other non-communal organism, as even the largest blue whales are likely to weigh one-sixteenth as much as a large giant sequoia or coast redwood. See list of superlative trees for other tree records.

Cycads (Cycadophyta)
The largest single-stemmed species of cycad is Hope's cycad (Lepidozamia hopei), endemic to the Australian state of Queensland.
However the multi-stemmed Encephalartos laurentianus (Zamiaceae) of Bandundu Province in Congo (Kinshasa) and in adjoining parts of Angola is much more massive. Assuming a density of 1.0, an old much-branched specimen could weigh up to 45 tonnes (50 short tons).

Flowering plants (Angiospermae)

This is the most diverse and numerous division of plants, with upwards of 400,000 species.

Clonal colonies
For two-dimensional area, the largest known clonal flowering plant, and indeed largest plant and organism, is a grove of male Aspen in Utah, nicknamed Pando (Populus tremuloides). The grove is connected by a single root system, and each stem above the ground is genetically identical.

A form of flowering plant that far exceeds Pando as the largest organism on earth in breadth, is the giant marine plant, Posidonia australis, living in Shark Bay, Australia. It is estimated to be over 4,500 years old. Believed to have sprouted from a single seed, it grows at about the same rate as a lawn, up to  a year.

Another form of flowering plant Posidonia oceanica discovered in the Mediterranean may be the oldest living organism in the world, with an estimated age of 100,000 years.

"Individual" plants

By a stricter definition of individuality, and using contending measures of size, Ficus benghalensis, the giant banyan trees of India are the largest trees in the world. In these trees, a network of interconnected stems and branches has grown entirely by vegetative, "branching" propagation. One individual, Thimmamma Marrimanu, in Andhra Pradesh, covers 19,107 square metres, making it the largest single tree by two-dimensional canopy coverage area. This tree is also the world's largest known tree by a related measure, perimeter length, with a distance of 846 metres required to walk around the edge of the canopy. Thimmama Marrimanu is likely also the world's largest tree by three-dimensional canopy volume.

The longest vine to be accurately measured is "Rattan Manau" (Calamus manan) of the palm family (historically Palmae, but now often Arecaceae) and native to the Malay Peninsula, Sumatra and Java.

Of herbaceous plants, plants without persistent woody growth above ground, Musa ingens is the largest. It can reach about 15 meters tall with a pseudostem diameter of around a meter. It also holds the record for the longest petioles or leaf stalks of any plant.

Bamboos are a subfamily (Bambusoideae) of flowering perennial plants in the grass family Poaceae, comprising three tribes: Arundinarieae, Bambuseae, and Olyreae. Dendrocalamus is a tropical genus of giant clumping bamboo found throughout Southeast Asia. It includes Dendrocalamus giganteus, which can reach heights up to 30 m.

Other records among flowering plants include, the title of largest flower, which belongs to the species Rafflesia arnoldii. The largest unbranched inflorescence, resembling (but not qualifying as) a giant flower, belongs to the titan arum (Amorphophallus titanum), reaching almost  in height. The largest leaves belong to either Gunnera manicata, Raphia regalis, Manicaria saccifera, Marojejya darianii, Johannesteijsmannia altifrons, or Victoria amazonica, depending on criteria.

Pteridophyta

Horsetails (Equisetopsida)
The largest of horsetail is the species Equisetum myriochaetum, native to Nicaragua, Costa Rica, Colombia, Venezuela, Ecuador, Peru and Mexico.

Ferns (Pteridopsida)
The largest species of fern is probably Cyathea brownii of Norfolk Island, which may be  or more in height.

Bryophytes

Liverworts (Marchantiophyta)
The largest species of liverwort is a New Zealand species, Schistochila appendiculata.

Mosses (Bryophyta)
The world's most massive moss is Dawsonia superba, of Australia and New Zealand. The tallest moss is Spiridens reinwardtii of the family Hypnodendraceae and native to Indonesia, Malaysia, Papua New Guinea, the Philippines, Melanesia and Taiwan. Spiridens reinwardtii is the only true vine among mosses and climbs by twining. The longest individuals seem to be in New Guinea.

See also
 List of superlative trees
 List of world records held by plants
 List of largest inflorescences
 List of world's largest seeds
 List of world's largest mushrooms and conks
 List of world's longest vines

References

Organism size
Largest
Plant